The Edward Novitski Prize is awarded by the Genetics Society of America (GSA) to recognize an extraordinary level of creativity and intellectual ingenuity in solving significant problems in genetics research.

Named in honor of Drosophila geneticist Edward Novitski (1918-2006), the award recognizes scientific achievement that stands out from the body of innovative work, that is deeply impressive to creative masters in the field, and that solves a difficult problem in genetics. It recognizes the beautiful and intellectually ingenious experimental design and execution involved in genetics scientific discovery.

The prize, established by the Novitski family, includes an engraved medal.

Award recipients
Source: 

 2008 Thomas J. Silhavy
 2009 Rodney J. Rothstein and Kent Golic
 2010 
 2011 Abby F. Dernburg
 2012 Dana Carroll
 2013 Jonathan K. Pritchard
 2014 Charles Boone
 2015 Sue Biggins
 2016 Leonid Kruglyak, HHMI and University of California, Los Angeles
 2017 Jonathan Hodgkin
 2018 Job Dekker
 2019 Joseph Heitman
 2020 Welcome Bender
 2021 Feng Zhang
 2022 Harmit Malik

See also
 List of genetics awards

External links
 The Edward Novitski Prize

References

Genetics awards
Awards established in 2008
American awards